Gourbia is a genus of moths belonging to the family Tineidae. It contains only one species, Gourbia staphylinella, which is found in Tunisia.

References

Tineidae
Monotypic moth genera
Endemic fauna of Tunisia
Moths of Africa
Tineidae genera